The Green Leaf is an experimental rock and roll band from San Diego, California, led by Mark Whitney Mehran. It was formed in 1992 and released its first full-length original album, Green Leaf, in 1995. Mehran has composed, arranged and played all of the instruments and vocals on The Green Leaf recordings since 1996. In the 1990s, The Green Leaf toured the independent music club scene for a number of years playing live shows as a traditional three piece rock outfit.  In 2007, Mehran teamed up with Harley Davidson of Deadbolt to record original instrumental music for the HOT ROD SURF How To Service Your Hot Rod! movie. The Green Leaf's music is published by HOT ROD SURF Publishing (ASCAP).

Movie soundtracks
The Green Leaf music is used on:
HOT ROD SURF All Steel All Real Vol.1 DVD movie(2003)
HOT ROD SURF  Pinstriping Techniques DVD movie (2007) the green leaf
Pinstrping Techniques Volume 2 DVD movie (2009)

Discography
The Green Leaf discography includes the first full-length album Green Leaf (1995), "The Green Leaf Racer" single (1995), The Green Leaf 2nd Album (1996), "California" 7" vinyl (1997), "Cat Scratcher" 7" vinyl (1997), M.T.G. full-length album (1997) released on limited edit red vinyl, Homegrown Live in San Diego (1997), Carnival of Corruption (1998), "Hot Rod Paradise" cassette single(1998), HOT ROD SURF plays Hot Rod Surf (2007) and HOT ROD SURF Pinstriping Techniques Volume 2 Soundtrack (2009).

References

External links
The Green Leaf official music video, Last.fm

Rock music groups from California
Musical groups from San Diego